The First Game is a painting by Arnold Friberg, and was commissioned in 1968 by Chevrolet Motor Division as one of four paintings to commemorate the then-upcoming centennial celebration of college football in the United States. It depicts the famous first game of American intercollegiate football, played by Rutgers College (now Rutgers University) and the visiting College of New Jersey (by then more commonly known as Princeton College) on November 6, 1869, at College Field in New Brunswick, New Jersey. The game was played in front of 100 spectators, who were also depicted in the picture.

The picture 
In The First Game, Friberg extolled the fight and physical strength of the game. His painting shows how bruised players collide each other. Some of them even have blood stains in their uniforms. Rutgers players wear a headscarf that resembles a piracy-style. The ball is small and round, like an association football. The field is covered by dry leaves, as usual in November, when the game was played. Spectators are seen at background, some are sitting on a fence, and others run along the players.

Spectators depicted include a Rutgers professor who is reported to have waved his umbrella at the participants while yelling, "You will come to no Christian end!" Friberg included the man with the umbrella in the painting as a tribute.

See also
 Early history of American football

References 

1968 paintings
Paintings by Arnold Friberg
Princeton Tigers football
Rutgers Scarlet Knights football
1869 college football season
Sports paintings
American football culture